"Shake 'Em On Down" is a Delta blues song by American musician Bukka White.  He recorded it  in Chicago in 1937 around the beginning of his incarceration at the infamous Parchman Prison Farm in Mississippi.

It was his first recording for producer Lester Melrose and remains his best-known song.  Several blues and other artists have adapted the song, often with variations on the lyrics and music. The English rock group Led Zeppelin adapted some of the lyrics for two of their songs.

Background
After several attempts at recording for Victor Records and Okeh Records in the early 1930s, Bukka White came to the attention of Vocalion Records' producer Lester Melrose.  Melrose arranged for White to record a single in Chicago in 1937, but White was arrested and convicted for a shooting incident and received a two-year sentence at Parchman Farm.  However, White did manage to record two songs"Shake 'Em On Down" and "Pinebluff, Arkansas"before serving his time, either by jumping bail or through an arrangement by Melrose.

Original song
"Shake 'Em On Down" was recorded September 2, 1937, by White on vocal and guitar with an unidentified second guitarist.  The song is a moderate-tempo twelve-bar blues notated in 4/4 time in the key of E. Music writer Mark Humphrey has described the rhythm as "shuffling" and its lyrics as "risqué":

The phrase "shake 'em on down" may have originated in White's claim that he extorted money from hobos when he was freighthopping trains in the early 1930s.

The song became a best seller and blues historian Ted Gioia notes that his single "earned White the status of a celebrity within Parchman".  Prior to his arrival at the Farm, the inmates and even guards contributed to the purchase of a guitar. White was largely exempt from the hardest work details and, in the evenings, spent a lot of time practicing.  He often performed, sometimes with a small combo, including for the governor"When White performed for the governor of Mississippi, on the latter's visit to Parchman, he was surprised that the politician already knew about him", according to Gioia. White recalled the governor asking him:

Largely on the strength of "Shake 'Em On Down", when White was released from prison, he was able to resume his recording career with Melrose and Vocalion, despite the shift in public taste that had taken place in the previous two and a half years.

Renditions by other artists
Following Bukka White's success, "Shake 'Em On Down" was recorded by several bluesmen. Some used White's title or a variation, such as "Ride 'Em On Down", "Break 'Em On Down", or "Truck 'Em On Down".  Big Bill Broonzy recorded a similar version in 1938, whose popularity surpassed the original.

In 1970, Led Zeppelin recorded "Hats Off to (Roy) Harper" for their third album.  Inspired by White's song, the liner notes credit the song to "Traditional, arranged by Charles Obscure" (a pseudonym of Jimmy Page) and uses some similar lyrics:

Biographer Martin Popoff noted that Robert Plant's vocal was recorded using an instrument amplifier with a vibrato effect, with Page providing a "buzzing bottleneck acoustic slide just as aggressively as Robert sings". Led Zeppelin's song "Custard Pie" (from 1975's Physical Graffiti) also borrows from "Shake 'Em On Down":

References

1937 songs
Blues songs
Bukka White songs
Big Bill Broonzy songs
Okeh Records singles
Bluebird Records singles